Järna is a locality situated in Södertälje Municipality, Stockholm County, Sweden with 6,377 inhabitants in 2010.

Järna has long been the centre of the anthroposophical movement in Sweden, and there is a private clinic, several schools and other institutions affiliated with the movement. A lot of the buildings, in the nearby village of Ytterjärna, are designed by the Danish-born anthroposophical architect Erik Asmussen (1913–1998), including the Cultural Centre in Ytterjärna, which in 2001 was voted the second best-liked modern building in Sweden.

Beata Bergström, photographer, resided here.

References 

Populated places in Södertälje Municipality